Rogelio Ortega may refer to:

 Rogelio Ortega Martínez (born 1955), Mexican educator and interim governor of Guerrero
 Rogelio Ortega (chess player) (1915–1980), Cuban chess player